The 5th Expeditionary Airborne Command and Control Squadron is a provisional squadron of the United States Air Force.  It is assigned to Pacific Air Forces to activate or inactivate as needed.

The squadron was formed as the 5th Airborne Command and Control Squadron in 1985 by the consolidation of the 25th Antisubmarine Squadron an Army Air Forces unit that served in the American Theater of World War II and the 25th Special Operations Squadron, a training unit during the Vietnam War.  The squadron was not active after the merger of these two units.  It was converted to expeditionary status in 2015.

History

World War II
The first predecessor of the squadron was the 25th Antisubmarine Squadron. The squadron was activated in May 1943 at Jacksonville Army Air Field and assigned to the 26th Antisubmarine Wing, which had responsibility for Army Air Forces (AAF) units conducting antisubmarine warfare off the South Atlantic coast and in the Caribbean Sea and the Gulf of Mexico.  It conducted antisubmarine patrols and assisted the United States Navy to protect friendly shipping off the southeastern coast of the United States from May through August 1943.  However, a month after the squadron was activated, the AAF had agreed to turn over its coastal antisubmarine mission to the Navy, effective in August 1943.  The squadron continued to operate its bombers, although Army Air Forces Antisubmarine Command became I Bomber Command under First Air Force.

In October 1943, the 25th moved to Clovis Army Air Field, New Mexico, becoming part of Second Air Force, which was responsible for advanced bomber training. At Clovis, the personnel and equipment of the squadron were assigned to other squadrons and the squadron was inactivated.

Vietnam War
The squadron's second predecessor was the 25th Special Operations Squadron, which was activated at Hurlburt Field, Florida on 31 August 1970.  The squadron was initially equipped with a variety of special operations aircraft, but lost most of them in 1971 and focused on photographic processing, interpretation, production, and distribution of reconnaissance information until it was inactivated in September 1974.

Consolidation
In 1985 the two squadrons were consolidated as the 5th Airborne Command and Control Squadron, but remained inactive.  The squadron was converted to provisional status in 2015 and allotted to Pacific Air Forces (PACAF) to activate or inactivate as needed for expeditionary operations.  PACAF has reportedly activated the squadron at Kadena Air Base, equipped with Northrop Grumman E-8 Joint STARS aircraft.

Lineage
 25th Antisubmarine Squadron
 Constituted as the 25th Antisubmarine Squadron (Heavy) on 20 April 1943
 Activated on 1 May 1943
 Disbanded on 28 October 1943
 Reconstituted on 19 September 1985 and consolidated with the 25th Special Operations Squadron as the 5th Airborne Command and Control Squadron

 25th Special Operations Squadron
 Constituted as the 25th Special Operations Squadron on 24 August 1970
 Activated on 31 August 1970
 Redesignated 25 Special Operations Squadron (Reconnaissance Support) on 1 June 1971
 Inactivated on 30 September 1974
 Consolidated with the 25th Antisubmarine Squadron as the 5th Airborne Command and Control Squadron on 19 September 1985

 Consolidated Squadron 
 Formed as the 5th Airborne Command and Control Squadron by the consolidation of the 25th Antisubmarine Squadron and the 25 Special Operations Squadron on 19 September 1985
 Redesignated 5th Expeditionary Airborne Command and Control Squadron and converted to provisional status on 30 June 2015

Assignments
 26th Antisubmarine Wing, 1 May 1943
 Second Air Force, 9–28 October 1943.\
 1st Special Operations Wing (later 834th Tactical Composite) Wing), 31 August 1970 – 30 September 1974
 Pacific Air Forces to activate or inactivate as needed at any time after 30 June 2015
 Unknown, after 2015

Stations
 Jacksonville Army Air Field, Florida, 1 May 1943
 Clovis Army Air Field, New Mexico, 9–28 October 1943
 Hurlburt Field, Florida, 31 August 1970 – 30 September 1974
 Kadena Air Base, Okinawa, Japan, after 2015

Aircraft

 Lockheed A-29 Hudson, 1943
 North American B-25 Mitchell, 1943
 Cessna A-37 Dragonfly, 1970-1971
 Fairchild C-123 Provider, 1970-1973
 Bell UH-1 Huey, 1970-1971
 Helio U-10 Courier, 1970-1971
 Sikorsky CH-3, 1973-1974
 Northrop Grumman E-8 JSTARS, after 2015

Awards and campaigns

References
 Notes

Bibliography

 
 
 
 

 Further reading
 

Air expeditionary squadrons of the United States Air Force
Command and control squadrons of the United States Air Force